Volodarka is a rural locality (a selo) and the administrative center of Volodarsky Selsoviet of Topchikhinsky District, Altai Krai, Russia. The population was 736 in 2016. There are 17 streets.

Geography 
Volodarka is located 54 km northwest of Topchikha (the district's administrative centre) by road. Belovo is the nearest rural locality.

References 

Rural localities in Topchikhinsky District